Liam Deasy (6 May 1896 – 20 August 1974) was an Irish Republican Army officer who fought in the Irish War of Independence and the Irish Civil War. In the latter conflict, he was second-in-command of the Anti-Treaty forces for a period in late 1922 and early 1923.

Early life
Deasy was born in Kilmacsimon, Bandon in County Cork on 6 May 1896, and educated in the local school at Ballinadee. He was the third son of William and Mary Deasy.

Irish War of Independence
In the War of Independence (1919–21, he was the Adjutant of the 3rd Cork Brigade (West Cork).

He served under Tom Barry in one of the unit's best known action, the Crossbarry Ambush in March 1921. His younger brother, Pat, died in  action at the Kilmichael Ambush in November 1920, an engagement which Liam Deasy himself was not present at.

He also took part in the Tooreen ambush.

Civil War
He opposed the Anglo-Irish Treaty which ended the war. In the months that followed he, along with others like Éamon de Valera and Liam Lynch, tried to persuade Michael Collins to renegotiate aspects of the treaty, especially to remove an oath to the British king from the constitution of the new Irish Free State. When fighting broke out in Dublin in June 1922, between pro and anti-Treaty forces, Deasy sided with the Anti-Treaty IRA in the ensuing Irish Civil War. However, he was reluctant to fight his former comrades and voiced the opinion that the fighting should have ended with the Free State seizure of the Four Courts.

In late July, he commanded 1,500 anti-treaty fighters who held a line around Kilmallock south of Limerick city against about 2,000 Free State troops under Eoin O'Duffy. Deasy's men were the most experienced IRA fighters of the 1919-21 war and held their position until 8 August, when they were outflanked by seaborne landings on the southern coast. Deasy's men then dispersed. He went on the run in the south-east of the country.

In August 1922, he was in command of a band of republican guerrillas in west Cork, when they heard that Free State leader Michael Collins was in the area. Deasy had his men prepare an ambush for Collins' convoy at Béal na Bláth, should it return by the same route it had taken earlier.

Deasy and most of his men did not take part in the ambush  as they had retired to a nearby pub, assuming that they had missed Collins. However, Collins arrived as the last of Deasy's men were clearing the mine and barricade that had been erected on the road at Béal na Bláth. Collins was killed in the ensuing firefight. Deasy later wrote in his memoirs that he profoundly regretted the death of his former commander. It is not clear that he gave orders otherwise to take on prisoners as the main intention of the ambush.

Capture
In January 1923, by which time he had become Deputy Chief of Staff of the IRA, he was captured by Free State forces near Clonmel and sentenced to death. He then signed a document ordering the men under his command to surrender themselves and their arms to the government, and for this he was spared execution. Republicans denounced him as a traitor and a coward for this action, but Deasy argued in his book, Brother against Brother that he was opposed to continuing the civil war anyway and would have called on republicans to surrender whether or not he had been captured.

Later life
Deasy took no further part in politics following the end of the civil war. In 1924, he set up a business making weatherproof textiles.On 24 November 1927, Deasy married Margaret Mary O'Donoghue; the two would have 3 daughters together.

During The Emergency, Deasy served in the Irish Army from 1940 to 1945, reaching the rank of commandant. Deasy would later write two memoirs about his experiences during the revolutionary period: Toward Ireland Free and Brother against Brother, the latter being published after his death.

He died at St. Anne's Hospital in Dublin on 20 August 1974.

Sources
Liam Deasy: Brother against Brother. Cork: Mercier Press, 1982; reissued 1998.
Edward Purdon: The Irish Civil War 1922-1923. Cork: Mercier Press, 2000.
Ernie O'Malley: The Men Will Talk to Me, West Cork Interviews, Cork: Mercier Press, 2015.

References

Irish Republican Army (1919–1922) members
Irish Republican Army (1922–1969) members
People from County Cork
1896 births
1974 deaths
Irish Army officers
People of the Irish Civil War (Anti-Treaty side)